In enzymology, a D-glutaminase is an enzyme that catalyzes the chemical reaction

D-glutamine + H2O  D-glutamate + NH3

Thus, the two substrates of this enzyme are D-glutamine and H2O, whereas its two products are D-glutamate and NH3.

This enzyme belongs to the family of hydrolases, those acting on carbon-nitrogen bonds other than peptide bonds, specifically in linear amides.  The systematic name of this enzyme class is D-glutamine amidohydrolase. This enzyme participates in d-glutamine and d-glutamate metabolism and nitrogen metabolism.

References

 

EC 3.5.1
Enzymes of unknown structure